Porchfests are annual music events held across the United States and in Canada on front porches. Started in Ithaca, New York, in 2007, porchfest events bring local musicians and neighborhoods together to celebrate and create a sense of community.

Porchfest music festivals began as a means for neighbors and local community members to highlight their music on front porches. The concept was to find musicians and porches on which they would play. The original event in Ithaca, New York, started with about 20 musicians but has since grown to over 100.

Bands, singers, and instrumentalists participate in the festival for no other reason than to showcase their talents and engage the community. Music is diverse and can range from country to pop, classical, reggae, blues, rock, jazz, Latino, R&B, folk and many others. Musicians voluntarily take to the "stage" on porches at their designated times and perform for the public. Signs with artists' names and performance times are usually posted in front of porches and online.

Volunteers and other organizations normally facilitate the event by selecting appropriate dates, acquiring musicians, and publicizing the event. Local residents volunteer their porches as a way to support the local music scene and interact with their neighbors. Events can last from a few hours to most of the day. Schedules and maps are usually posted online or in local media.

Because these are normally neighborhood events people walk, ride bikes or scooters, drive golf carts, or push strollers as they move from one porch to another along a determined route to partake in the festivities. Children often build lemonade stands to help quench thirst on hot days while vendors oftentimes provide ice cream, hot dogs, and other snacks. A few porchfests have expanded to include arts festivals as well.

These annual events can now be found across the country, from its beginnings in Ithaca, New York to places including Buffalo, New York; Athens, Georgia; Franklin (Westhaven), Tennessee; Napa, California; Sacramento, California; Larchmere, Cleveland, Ohio;  Tucson, Arizona; Decatur, Georgia; Salt Lake City, Utah; Ventnor City, New Jersey; Newark, New Jersey, Washington, D.C.;  Rhinebeck, New York; Stamford, New York;Kansas City, Missouri; North Liberty, Iowa; cities and towns in Massachusetts including Somerville, Jamaica Plain, Arlington, Roslindale, Newton, Quincy, Swampscott, Melrose and Wellfleet; Springfield, Jacksonville, Florida, Grants Pass, Oregon; Mount Pleasant, Michigan; West Chester, Pennsylvania; Philadelphia, Pennsylvania; Folly Beach, South Carolina; Bridgeport, Connecticut; Old Wethersfield, Connecticut; San Antonio, Texas and Flint, Michigan. Porchfests are also celebrated in Canada, including in Montreal, and Hudson, Quebec; Vankleek Hill, Ontario; Peterborough; Whitevale, Ontario; Belleville, Ontario and Hintonburg neighborhood of Ottawa.

References

External links 
 

Music festivals in the United States